General elections were held in Suriname on 24 October 1969. The result was a victory for the VHP bloc (an alliance of the VHP, the Indonesian People's Party and the Action Group), which won 19 of the 39 seats.

Results

References

Suriname
Elections in Suriname
1969 in Suriname
Suriname
Election and referendum articles with incomplete results